Virginia's 19th Senate district is one of 40 districts in the Senate of Virginia. It has been represented by Republican David Suetterlein since 2016, succeeding his retiring former boss Ralph K. Smith.

Geography
District 19 is based in Southwest Virginia, including all of Floyd County and the City of Salem and parts of Bedford, Carroll, Franklin, Montgomery, Roanoke, and Wythe Counties.

The district overlaps with Virginia's 5th, 6th, and 9th congressional districts, and with the 6th, 7th, 8th, 9th, 12th, 17th, and 22nd districts of the Virginia House of Delegates.

Recent election results

2019

2015

2011

Federal and statewide results in District 19

Historical results
All election results below took place prior to 2011 redistricting, and thus were under different district lines. In 2011, Ralph K. Smith, the incumbent from the 22nd district, was redistricted into the 19th district; meanwhile, then-19th district incumbent Bill Stanley was redistricted into the 20th district.

2011 special

2007

2003

1999

1995

References

Virginia Senate districts
Bedford County, Virginia
Carroll County, Virginia
Floyd County, Virginia
Franklin County, Virginia
Montgomery County, Virginia
Roanoke County, Virginia
Salem, Virginia
Wythe County, Virginia